This is an alphabetically sorted list of cities and towns severely damaged by the 2011 Tōhoku earthquake and tsunami. Cities and towns listed here reported at least  in damage or at least one death.

References

Lists of cities